The 40/4 chair is the compactly stackable chair designed by David Rowland in 1964. Forty chairs can be stacked within a height of 4 feet (120 cm), giving the chair its name.  Over time it has received a number of design awards and is in the permanent collection of the Museum of Modern Art in New York, as well as other museums internationally.

Description
The frame of the chair is made of 7/16” solid steel rod. The seat and back are formed sheet metal with 3/16” rolled edges and coated in vinyl. Some models substitute wood veneers, plastic resin and upholstery over wood as components.

Chairs can be stacked on specially designed dollies for storage and movement.  Various configurations allow the chairs to be stacked in a number of ways while striving to minimize the floor space utilized.

In 2004 Rowland worked with Howe a/s to introduce an expanded family of the 40/4 chair.

History
Rowland developed the 40/4 chair over a period of 8 years.  In 1963 he was awarded a patent for the chair's design.

Initially, Rowland showed the chair to many companies in an effort to license the design.  In 1961, Florence Knoll licensed the chair for her company, Knoll Associates, however canceled a license after six months.  Rowland later showed the chair to Davis Allen, head of interior design at the architectural firm of Skidmore, Owings & Merrill (SOM).  Allen requested 17,000 chairs for the a campus SOM was designing for the University of Illinois at Chicago (UIC).  To fulfill the request, Rowland licensed the design to General Fireproofing Co. (GF) in Youngstown, Ohio.  In May 1965, While the first order for was still being produced, 250 chairs were hand assembled and installed in the Museum of Modern Art in New York City for the opening of its new wing.

The 40/4 was an immediate success. It won the grand prize at the prestigious 13th Milan Triennale, and has been included in museum collections and exhibitions internationally.

In the book the Modern Chair, Clement Meadmore described the chair as having “beautiful simplicity and total appropriateness.” Twenty five hundred 40/4s were installed in St. Paul’s Cathedral in London in 1973, site of Prince Charles and Princess Diana’s wedding, and remain in use. In 2001 it was named #1 of The Top 10 Commercial Interiors products of the Past 50 Years by Contract Design Magazine.

The chair has been in continuous production since its introduction and has sold over 8 million units.

General Fireproofing held the license for the chair from 1963 until 2002 when the company was taken over by OSI Furniture LLC.  In 2013, Howe Europe, (now Howe a/s), of Denmark, which had had a sublicense to the chair in Europe, Africa, Australia, New Zealand and Asia (except for Indonesia) acquired the license for the 40/4 in the United States and Canada. In Indonesia, PT. Indovickers Furnitama holds the license, and also produces the 40/4 in a rattan version.

Awards and recognition
 Grand Prize at the 13th Triennale in Milan, Italy, 1964
 International Design Award, American Institute of Interior Designers (A.I.D.), 1965
 Master Design Award from Product Engineering Magazine, 1965
 Gold Medal Award for Furniture from the Austrian Government, 1968
 Industrial Design Award, International Biennial Exhibition, Rio de Janeiro, 1968
 Design in America: The Cranbrook Vision 1925-1950 exhibition, Metropolitan Museum of Art, New York, 1984
 “The Modern Chair” exhibition, The Art Institute, Chicago, IL
 “Please Be Seated” exhibition, Smithsonian Institution, Washington D.C.
 U.S. Industrial Design exhibit at XIX Olympiad Games, Mexico City
 Dimensions of Design exhibition - 100 Classical Seats, Vitra Design Museum
 The Product of Design exhibition Katonah Gallery, Westchester, New York
 Number 1 of The Top 10 Commercial Interiors Products of the Past 50 Years, Contract Magazine, 2010

Curated examples
 The Museum of Modern Art (MoMA), New York, New York
 The Metropolitan Museum of Art, New York, New York
 The Palais du Louvre, Musée des Arts Decoratifs, Paris, France
 The Victoria and Albert Museum, London, England
 The Design Museum, London, England
 The University of Dundee Museum, Dundee, Scotland
 Die Neue Sammlung, Munich, Germany
 The Museu de Arte Moderna, Rio de Janeiro, Brazil
 The Art Institute of Chicago, Chicago, Illinois
 The Philadelphia Museum of Art, Philadelphia, Pennsylvania
 Cranbrook Academy of Art Museum, Bloomfield Hills, Michigan
 Musée des Arts Decoratifs, Montreal, Canada

See also
 David Rowland
 Industrial Design

References

External links
 David Rowland Official Website
 Howe's Website for the 40/4 Chair

History of furniture
Chairs
Modernism
Individual models of furniture
Stacking chairs